Lila Latrous (born July 15, 1979) is an Algerian judoka, who played for the lightweight category. She is a four-time champion at the African Judo Championships, and a bronze medalist at the 2009 Mediterranean Games in Pescara, Italy. She also won a gold medal in the same division at the 2007 All-Africa Games in Algiers.

Latrous made her official debut for the 2004 Summer Olympics in Athens, where she lost the first preliminary match of women's lightweight class (57 kg), with an ippon and an okuri eri jime (sliding lapel strangle), to former Olympic bronze medalist Liu Yuxiang.

At the 2008 Summer Olympics in Beijing, Latrous competed for the second time in the women's 57 kg class. She lost again the first preliminary match by an ippon to another Chinese judoka Xu Yan. Unlike her previous Olympics, Latrous offered another shot for the bronze medal by entering the repechage rounds. Unfortunately, she was defeated in the first match by Finland's Nina Koivumäki, who successfully scored a koka and a golden score within the five-minute period.

References

External links

NBC Olympics Profile

Algerian female judoka
Living people
Olympic judoka of Algeria
Judoka at the 2004 Summer Olympics
Judoka at the 2008 Summer Olympics
1979 births
Mediterranean Games bronze medalists for Algeria
Competitors at the 2009 Mediterranean Games
African Games gold medalists for Algeria
African Games medalists in judo
Mediterranean Games medalists in judo
Competitors at the 2007 All-Africa Games
21st-century Algerian people